Devil's Millhopper Geological State Park is a Florida State Park located in the north-westernmost part of Gainesville, Florida, off County Road 232, also known as NW 53rd Avenue and Millhopper Road, northwest of the University of Florida.

The park is maintained by the Florida State Parks system, a division of the Florida Department of Environmental Protection. The park is adjacent to San Felasco County Park and is near the San Felasco Hammock Preserve State Park.

Geology
The most prominent feature of State Park is the large sinkhole formed by the dissolution of limestone by acidic groundwater over long periods of time.

The cutaway, limestone sides of the sinkhole provide an easily visible geological record of the area. Twelve springs, some more visible than others, feed the pond at the bottom of the sinkhole. In the summer, the bottom of the sinkhole is dramatically cooler than the air at the surface due to the depth and shade from the canopy above. Significant fossil deposits include shark teeth, marine shells, and the fossilized remains of extinct land animals.

Ecology
Even though the park is only , three distinct ecological environments exist in the park, based on exposure to sun, fire, and water. In the sandhill environment, the sandy soil and regular fires result in pine trees being the predominant vegetation. The moist soils of the hammocks support broadleaf trees and more low vegetation, while the swamp areas only support flora and fauna adapted to year-around wet conditions.

History
The 120 foot (40 m) deep, 500 foot (150 m) wide sinkhole got its name from its similar appearance to the hopper of a mill, along with the bones found at the bottom, suggesting animals entered it on the way to meeting the devil. The Millhopper was owned for a time by the science department at the University of Florida and used as a research site for the students. Its unique ecosystem made it an invaluable resource for study. However, the Millhopper was often used by students as a place to socialize and have parties, which led to problems with litter and erosion from foot traffic.

The site was purchased by the state in 1974, and a set of 236 wooden steps, along with boardwalks and an observation deck at the bottom were completed in 1976 to allow access to the sink for visitors without further soil erosion.

The boardwalk was damaged by Hurricane Irma in September 2017, and closed to the public. The damaged boardwalk was replaced with a 132-step structure that ends higher in the sinkhole than the old one did. The path into the sinkhole reopened to the public on June 5, 2019.

The formation was designated a National Natural Landmark in 1974, and was listed on the National Register of Historic Places (in part for its surviving Civilian Conservation Corps infrastructure) in 2017.

See also

Florida State Parks in Alachua County
 List of sinkholes of the United States
 National Register of Historic Places listings in Alachua County, Florida

References

External links

Devil's Millhopper State Geological Site at Florida State Parks
Devil's Millhopper State Geological Site at Absolutely Florida
Devil's Millhopper State Geological Site at Wildernet
Devils's Millhopper from a Visitor's Perspective

Parks in Alachua County, Florida
State parks of Florida
National Natural Landmarks in Florida
Protected areas established in 1974
Tourist attractions in Gainesville, Florida
Geography of Gainesville, Florida
Landforms of Alachua County, Florida
Sinkholes of Florida
1974 establishments in Florida
National Register of Historic Places in Alachua County, Florida